Admiral Mom Luang Usni Pramoj (1 July 1934 – 2 April 2017) was a Thai musician and courtier.

Education
Usni was the son of Mom Rajawongse Seni Pramoj, twice Prime Minister and one of the major political figures of 20th-century Thai history, and Khunying Usana Pramoj Na Ayutthaya. In his youth he attended Bangkok Christian College before studying law at the University of Oxford. He then studied for the Bar at the Gray's Inn, qualifying as a barrister.

Government career
A lawyer by profession, Usni began his career as a judge advocate in the Ministry of Defence. In 1968 he was appointed as Manager of H.M. the King's Private Property Office (part of the Crown Property Bureau). He served as Privy Councillor to two Thai kings for over three decades, from 1984 to 2016. He was an honorary Admiral of the Royal Thai Navy.

Musical career
Usni was a distinguished a violinist and composer who founded the Bangkok Symphony Orchestra and was twice named a National Artist of Thailand.

References

Pramoj, Usni
Pramoj, Usni
Members of Gray's Inn
Usni Pramoj
Alumni of the University of Oxford
Usni Pramoj
Usni Pramoj
Usni Pramoj
Usni Pramoj
Usni Pramoj
Usni Pramoj